In United States military doctrine, LERTCON is an abbreviation of alert condition, and is a measure of the level of action and readiness to be taken in a given situation. LERTCON is used by US and Allied forces who are assigned to NATO. There are specific procedures laid out for responses to changes in LERTCON. LERTCON levels can be broken down into high-alert emergency condition levels (EMERGCONs) and the more common Defense Condition levels (DEFCONs).

Levels 
LERTCON 5/4: Peacetime conditions
LERTCON 3.5: Military vigilance
LERTCON 3: Simple alert
LERTCON 2: Reinforced alert
LERTCON 1: General alert

See also
 FPCON
 INFOCON
 DEFCON
 REDCON
 Alert state

References 

Alert measurement systems
Military terminology of the United States